The Ministry of Interior is the interior ministry of Syria. Its headquarters are located on Kafr Sousa in Damascus.

According to the Ministry official website, its tasks are limited to the protection and enforcement of security.

Organization 
The Ministry of Interior is divided into several Directorates:
General Security Directorate;
 Political Security Directorate;
 Criminal Security Directorate;
 Anti-Narcotics Directorate;
 Medical Services Directorate.

The Ministry of Interior also have a quick reaction force, the Syrian Special Mission Forces.

Ministers of Interior

 Taj al-Din al-Hasani (17 May 1934 – 23 February 1936)
 Ata Bey al-Ayyubi (23 February 1936 – 21 December 1936)
 Saadallah al-Jabiri (21 December 1936 – 18 February 1939)
 Nasuhi al-Bukhari (5 April 1939 – 8 July 1939)

 Khalid al-Azm (3 April 1941 – September 1941)
 Lutfi al-Haffar (19 August 1943 – 14 October 1944)
 Rushdi al-Kikhya (14 August 1949 – 12 December 1949)
 Rashad Barmada (4 June 1950 – 27 March 1951)
 Sami Kabbara (28 March 1951 – 8 August 1951)
 Rashad Barmada (9 August 1951 – 28 November 1951)
 Sabri al-Asali (31 December 1956 – 6 March 1958)
 Abdel Hamid al-Sarraj (6 March 1958 – 28 September 1961)
 Adnan Qutla (29 September 1961 – 20 November 1961)
 Ahmad Qanbar (22 December 1961 – 27 March 1962)
 Abdel Halim Qaddur (16 April 1962 – 17 September 1962)
 Aziz Abdul Karim (17 September 1962 – 8 March 1963)

 Amin al-Hafiz (9 March 1963 – 4 August 1963)
 Nureddin al-Atassi (4 August 1963 – 14 May 1964)
 Mohamed Fahmy Achouri (14 May 1964 – 3 October 1964)
 Abd al-Karim al-Jundi (3 October 1964 – 24 December 1964)
 Mohammed Khair Badawi (24 December 1964 – 23 September 1965)
 Mohammed Eid Achaoui (23 September 1965 – 27 December 1965)
 Mohamed Fahmy Achouri (1 January 1966 – 23 February 1966)
 Mohammed Eid Achaoui (1 March 1966 – 28 October 1968)
 Mohammed Rabah Al-Tawil (28 October 1968 – 21 November 1970) 
Abdul Rahman Khalafawi (21 November 1970 – 4 March 1971)
Ali Zaza (4 March 1971 – 8 July 1976)
Adnan Dabbagh (8 July 1976 – 14 January 1980)
Nasser al-Din Nasser (14 January 1980 – 8 April 1985)
Mohammad Ghobash (8 April 1985 – 11 January 1987) 
Muhammad Harba (11 January 1987 – 12 December 2001)
Ali Hammoud (13 December 2001  – 7 October 2004)
Ghazi Kanaan (7 October 2004 – 12 October 2005)
Bassam Abdel Majeed (12 February 2006 – 23 April 2009)
Said Sammour (23 April 2009 – 14 April 2011)
Mohammad al-Shaar (14 April 2011 – 26 November 2018)
Mohammad Khaled al-Rahmoun (26 November 2018 – incumbent)

Related pages 
 Government of Syria
 Law enforcement in Syria

References

Syria
Interior